Rogue Saucer is a Star Trek: The Next Generation novel by John Vornholt.  Rogue Saucer specifically takes place between the 7th season of the television series and the movie Generations.

Plot
After an attack by the Maquis orchestrated by Ro Laren, the saucer section is damaged and in need of repairs. While at the dry dock facilities, Captain Picard receives new orders from Admiral Nechayev to test a new saucer section.

This new saucer section has been designed to be able to land on a planetary body and lift off from the surface, overcoming a reluctance by captains to carry out a saucer sep. The stardrive section of the Enterprise-D is attached to this new saucer, which is then taken out for field testing.  During the course of the mission, the saucer section is hijacked by Maquis operatives (one of whom is among Nechayev's test crew), who intend to re-dock it with the stardrive section and take it over, and Picard finds himself having to prevent the saucer and the technology contained within from falling into Maquis hands.

The saucer does make a controlled crash, under conditions not conducive to its recovery, on a planet with a primitive sentient culture that could one day discover the saucer at the bottom of its ocean, depending on how durable Starfleet metals are.

Meanwhile, Ro's hideaway is found by the Cardassians and attacked, leading to a narrow escape.

External links

1996 American novels
Novels by John Vornholt
Novels based on Star Trek: The Next Generation